Managathi is a village in the Udayarpalayam taluk of Ariyalur district, Tamil Nadu, India.

Demographics 

As per the 2001 census, Managethi had a total population of 3503 with 1755 males and 1748 females in this village 80 percentage people's are from konar or yadav community.

References 

Villages in Ariyalur district